Royal Motor Car Company was a Brass Era manufacturer of luxury automobiles in Cleveland, Ohio, in business from 1904 to 1911.  It was the result of a reorganization of the Hoffman Automobile Company.

History 
In November 1903, Edward Shurmer took over the Hoffman Automobile Company and reorganized it as the Royal Motor Car Company. For 1904 the new company introduced the Royal Tourist, a touring car model.  Equipped with a tonneau, it could seat five passengers and sold for $2,300, . The Model O has a vertically mounted water-cooled straight-twin, situated at the front of the car and producing 16 hp (11.9 kW).  A three-speed sliding transmission was fitted and the pressed steel-framed car weighed 1700 lb (771 kg).  A modern cellular radiator was used, and the car rivaled the offerings of cross-town rival, Peerless.

Later that same year a 4-cylinder 32/35-hp Model K was introduced on the same chassis, priced at $3,000, and for 1904 total production was 100 cars.  Robert Jardine, a Frenchman with extensive European experience was hired as the chief engineer.

The twin-cylinder was dropped and the company built successively larger motor cars, increasing to 40 and 45-hp and priced from $3,500 to $4,000. In 1907 a $5,000 limousine was introduced.  In 1905 a factory Royal Tourist participated in the Vanderbilt Cup trials but was not selected for the race. The Royal Tourist was extensively advertised as the car that placed third in the trials.

Royal Tourists were known as big, luxurious and reliable cars and used the slogan "The Pink of Perfection” in early advertising. The roundness of radiator, hood and cowl was a distinguishing design of the Royal Tourist for all of its production. In 1906, the first reorganization occurred and the company was renamed the Royal Motor Car & Manufacturing Company.

In September 1907 the Royal Tourist moved into a new factory. In November 1907, with the effects of the Panic of 1907, the company went into receivership.  In December 1908, a court judge authorized the sale of the company's assets to a new corporation named the Royal Tourist Car Company, headed by Bostonian, George Dunham.

Robert Jardine had developed a six-cylinder motor for the Royal Tourist but the financial issues resulted in its cancellation.  A novel idea for 1909 Royal Tourist's was Its horn placed under the hood, with only the bulb for sounding it at the center of the steering wheel hub.  This was claimed as a first.

In March, 1911 Royal Tourist Car Company merged with Croxton Motor Car Company of Cleveland and the Acme Body & Veneer Company of Rahway, New Jersey to form the Consolidated Motor Car Company.  Herbert Croxton was president and Edward Schurmer was treasurer. Robert Jardine left and joined the engineering department of Jeffery in Kenosha, Wisconsin.  Within a few months the merger fell apart and the Royal Tourist was discontinued.  The F. B. Stearns Company of Cleveland purchased many of the assets.

Advertisements

Model Gallery

See also
 The Royal Tourist in the Vanderbilt Cup Races
 Royal Tourist at ConceptCarz
 Frank Leslie's Popular Monthly (January, 1904)

References

Defunct motor vehicle manufacturers of the United States
Defunct companies based in Cleveland
Manufacturing companies based in Cleveland
Motor vehicle manufacturers based in Ohio
Vehicle manufacturing companies established in 1904
Vehicle manufacturing companies disestablished in 1911
Luxury vehicles
Luxury motor vehicle manufacturers
Brass Era vehicles
1900s cars
1910s cars
Cars introduced in 1904